Never Be the Same may refer to:

 Never Be the Same (album), by Victoria Banks, 2011
 "Never Be the Same" (Camila Cabello song), 2017
 "Never Be the Same" (Christopher Cross song), 1979
 "Never Be the Same" (Jessica Mauboy song), 2014
 "Never Be the Same" (Red song), 2009
 "Never Be the Same", a 2017 song by KLP

See also 
 "I'll Never Be the Same", song recorded by Frank Sinatra and many others
 Never Be the Same Again (disambiguation)
 Never Gonna Be the Same (disambiguation)